The Bureau of Drug Abuse Control was formed as a part of the United States Food and Drug Administration in February 1966 and existed until 1968 when it was merged with the Federal Bureau of Narcotics to form the Bureau of Narcotics and Dangerous Drugs. It was later combined with various other agencies to establish the Drug Enforcement Administration in July 1973.

See also

 List of United States federal law enforcement agencies

History of drug control
Defunct federal law enforcement agencies of the United States
Government agencies established in 1966